The Doge's Palace Seen from San Giorgio Maggiore is a 1908 painting by Claude Monet. It is currently in the collection of the Metropolitan Museum of Art. This painting, catalogued W1755, is one of six versions of this scene painted by Monet in 1908.  Other versions are held by the Kunsthaus Zürich, and the Solomon R. Guggenheim Museum.

Early history and creation
Monet created this work during his visit to Venice in late 1908. He returned to his home in France with many paintings incomplete, and he took a few years to prepare 29 works for exhibition. In 1912 he held a successful show Claude Monet Venise at the gallery Bernheim-Jeune in Paris.

Six of these paintings were created in order to capture the different light effects created throughout the day. Monet often made multiple copies of the same work of art; this process is better known as series painting. His series paintings originated in his early career when he and other impressionists became interested in en plein air and were inspired by the effects of changing light.

The Doge's Palace was done later in his career after he had already established his artistic style, however this work is considered less successful because of the little time he spent in Venice and that he had to finish the series by memory later in Paris.

Description and interpretation
The Doge's Palace is made with oil on canvas and its dimensions are 25 3/4 x 36 1/2 inches.  

This work depicts the Doge's Palace, an iconic landmark of Venice and the historic seat of government of the Republic of Venice, along with buildings of the Riva degli Schiavoni waterfront. The scene is viewed from the island of San Giorgio Maggiore.

Later history and influence
Although Monet spent little time in Venice, works that he started in Venice, such as The Doge's Palace, are some of his most highly regarded artworks. These paintings capture his signature style and influence from the effervescent Venetian sunset. After this painting was exhibited in Paris in 1912 it went on to travel the world, and has now made a permanent home at the Metropolitan Museum of Art in New York, N.Y.

References

Metropolitan Museum of Art 2017 drafts
Paintings in the collection of the Metropolitan Museum of Art
Paintings of Venice by Claude Monet
1908 paintings
Water in art
Paintings of Venice